The IWRG Junior de Juniors Championship is a professional wrestling championship promoted by the Mexican lucha libre (Professional wrestling) promotion International Wrestling Revolution Group (IWRG) since February 2011. The championship is only for second or third generation wrestlers, with IWRG also accepting storyline relationships like Hijo de Máscara Año 2000 who is not actually related to Máscara Año 2000 but is paying for the use of the name. IWRG never revealed how Oficial Factor qualified as a second generation wrestler.

The current champion is Dick Angelo 3G who defeated El Hijo del Alebrije to win the championship on March 27, 2022. As it is a professional wrestling championship, the championship was not won not by actual competition, but by a scripted ending to a match determined by the bookers and match makers. On occasion the promotion declares a championship vacant, which means there is no champion at that point in time. This can either be due to a storyline, or real life issues such as a champion suffering an injury being unable to defend the championship, or leaving the company.

Championship tournaments
IWRG held a one night, ten-man tournament on February 6, 2011, to determine the first ever IWRG Junior de Junior Champion. The tournament started with a Battle royal where the last two in the ring would advance straight to the semi finals. El Hijo de Pirata Morgan and Trauma I advanced to the semi final match and El Hijo de Pirata Morgan defeated El Hijo de L.A. Park in the final.

Title history

Combined reigns

Footnotes

References

External links
 IWRG Junior de Juniors Championship

International Wrestling Revolution Group championships